Mohelnice nad Jizerou is a municipality and village in Mladá Boleslav District in the Central Bohemian Region of the Czech Republic. It has about 90 inhabitants. It lies on the Jizera River.

Administrative parts
The village of Podhora is an administrative part of Mohelnice nad Jizerou.

References
 

Villages in Mladá Boleslav District